Cercidia prominens is a species of orb weaver in the family of spiders known as Araneidae. It is found in North America, Europe, the Caucasus, and a range from Russia to Kazakhstan.

References

External links

 

Araneidae
Articles created by Qbugbot
Spiders described in 1851